Nizam-Ud-Din Ahmad III or Nizam Ahmed Shah or Nizam Shah Bahmani was the sultan of the Bahmani Sultanate from 1461 to 1463. During his reign, the administration of the sultanate was mainly handled by the Persian prime minister Mahmud Gawan.

Reign 
Nizam Shah was the eldest son of Humayun Zalim Shah and ascended the throne on 4 September 1461 on the death of his father at the age of eight. His father had appointed a council of regents to ensure the smooth running of the kingdom during his son's minority and so the real power was held by his advisor Mahmud Gawan and his wife Makhduma-e-Jahan Nargis Begum as regents.  His reign, however, was short and Nizam Shah died on 30 July 1463 and was succeeded by his younger brother Muhammad Shah III Lashkari.

References

Sultans
1453 births
1463 deaths
Indian Muslims
Bahmani Sultans